Tibs the Great (November 1950 – December 1964) was the British Post Office's "number one cat" and kept the post office headquarters in London completely mouse-free during his 14 years of service. He was the son of Minnie, and on his death, several newspapers ran an obituary.

Background
Cats had been officially employed by the Post Office to catch rodents since September 1868, when three cats were taken on for a six-month trial period at a rate of one shilling per week, in the London Money Order Office. On 7 May 1869, it was noted that "the cats have done their duty very efficiently". By 1873, the cats were being paid 1s 6d, and cats were being employed in other post offices.

Early life
It is thought that Tibs was born in London in November 1950. His father is unknown. His mother was Minnie, another "fine cat".

Career
Tibs worked at Post Office Headquarters in London for 14 years, and was officially employed and paid 2s 6d per week. He worked in the basement. He was cared for by Alf Talbut, cleaner at the church of St. Martin's Le Grand, who had also owned his mother, Minnie. During his 14 years, Tibs kept the Post Office headquarters completely free of mice.

In 1952 there was "public outrage" that the cats had not had a pay rise since 1873, and the next year there was a question in the House of Commons, asking the Assistant Postmaster-General, David Gammans, "when the allowance payable for the maintenance of cats in his department was last raised?"

Gammans replied,

He also hastened to assure the House that Post Office cats had "an adequate maternity service", and that equal pay prevailed in the group.

In media
In 1953, Tibs was featured in a book titled Cockney Cats by Warren Tute and Felix Fonteyn. He also appeared at a "Cats and Film Stars" party.

Death
Tibs died in December 1964; he had been suffering from oral cancer. He received obituaries in several newspapers.

The last cat employed at Post Office headquarters was Blackie, who died in 1984, which coincided with cloth sacks being replaced with rodent-resistant plastic sacks.

See also
 Chief Mouser to the Cabinet Office
 Stubbs, an American cat appointed honorary mayor of Talkeetna, Alaska
 Tama (cat), Stationmaster of Kishi Station, Wakayama, Japan
 List of individual cats

References

Further reading
 

1950 animal births
1964 animal deaths
Animal deaths from cancer
British civil servants
Deaths from cancer in England
Deaths from oral cancer
Individual cats in England
Mammal pest control
Royal Mail
Working cats